Interfaith Voices is a radio newsmagazine that is syndicated on 69 public and community radio stations in North America. The show features interviews and produced segments covering the world of religion, spirituality, and ethics. It was founded by Maureen Fiedler, who hosted the show from 2001 to 2018. The current host is Amber Khan. 

Past guests have included:

Francis Collins
Christopher Hitchens
Anne Rice
Vinessa Shaw
Douglas Vakoch
Ruth Westheimer (Dr. Ruth)
Rainn Wilson

The show is pre-recorded each week in the studios of 88.5 WAMU at American University.

See also 

 List of religion and spirituality podcasts

References

External links 

American religious radio programs
American talk radio programs